This was the first edition of the event.

Bozoljac won the title, defeating Evgeny Donskoy in the final, 6–1, 6–1.

Seeds

Draw

Finals

Top half

Bottom half

References
 Main Draw
 Qualifying Draw

State Bank of India ATP Challenger Tour - Singles
2014 Singles